The Restored Apostolic Mission Church (Hersteld Apostolische Zendingkerk - HAZK) was a Bible-believing, chiliastic church society in the Netherlands, Germany, South Africa and Australia. It came forth from the Catholic Apostolic Congregation at Hamburg that separated itself from the mother-church in 1863. By 1969-1971 it had divided into three sections.

Further reading
 Johannes Albrecht Schröter: Die Katholisch-Apostolischen Gemeinden in Deutschland und der "Fall Geyer"; (Tectum Verlag) 3rd lightly improved print, 2004 – .
 Dr. M.J. Tang: Het apostolische Werk in Nederland (tegen de achtergrond van zijn ontstaan in Engeland en Duitsland); (Boekencentrum) Den Haag, 1st print 1982, 4th print 1989. - .
 Helmut Obst: Apostel und Propheten der Neuzeit; (Verlag Vandenhoeck & Ruprecht) Göttingen. - 
 Kurt Hutten: Seher - Grübler - Enthusiasten; Stuttgart, various prints.
 M. van Bemmel (and others): De ware oorzaak der scheuring in de Hersteld Apostolische Zendinggemeente in Nederland; Amsterdam 1897.
 A.J. Korff: Beknopte geschiedenis der Apostolische Kerk; (1st print, approx. 1935; 2nd print - supplemented by J. van Bemmel - 1963)
 J. van der Poorten: Mijn Koninkrijk is niet van deze wereld; Woodridge, 1976.

Catholic Apostolic Church denominations